Miss Europe 1996 was the 51st edition of the Miss Europe pageant and the 40th edition under the Mondial Events Organization. It was held in Tirana, Albania on 28 September 1996. Marie-Claire Harrison of England, was crowned Miss Europe 1996 by out going titleholder Monika Žídková of the Czech Republic.

Results

Placements

Special awards

Contestants 

 - Hygerta Sako
 - Karine Khachatrian
 - Yelena Shcherbak
 - Laëtitia Bureau
 - Svetlana Stoianova
 - Christiana Stavrinides (Christina Stavrinidou)
 - Iva Kubelková
 - Anette Oldenborg
 - Marie-Claire Harrison
 - Kaie Kaas
 - Anitra Ahtola
 -  Caroline Cléry
 - Natia Gogichiashvili
 - Miriam Ruppert
 - Nonie Dounia
 - Virginia Koopmans
 - Sólveig Lilja Guðmundsdóttir
 - Joanne Black
 - Kim Roslikov
 - Anna Valle
 - Ilvita Liepiņa
 - Sonata Pulkauskaitė
 - Christiane Lorent
 - Donna Evans Xwereb
 - Agata Dworniczek
 - Rita Carvalho
 - Angela Patau
 - Victoria Bogdanova
 - Marcela Jánová
 - Aurelia Barrera Escalera
 - Anna Olin
 - Mariana Barleycorn
 - Pinar Yiğit
 - Radmila Lalazarova
 - Zara Baynes

Notes

Withdrawals
 - No delegate sent
 - No delegate sent
 - No delegate sent
 - No delegate sent

Debuts/Returns

Returns

"Comité Officiel et International Miss Europe" Competition

From 1951 to 2002 there was a rival Miss Europe competition organized by the "Comité Officiel et International Miss Europe". This was founded in 1950 by Jean Raibaut in Paris, the headquarters later moved to Marseille. The winners wore different titles like Miss Europe, Miss Europa or Miss Europe International.

This year's competition took place in Izmir, Turkey. There were 30 contestants from 28 countries and 2 regions. At the end, Mimmi Gunnarsson of Sweden was originally crowned as Miss Europa 1996; however she was later dethroned. The crown then went to Jenni Rautawaara of Finland. Both Gunnarsson and Rautawaara succeeded predecessor Yolanda Marcos Gonzales of Spain.

Placements

Special awards

Contestants

 - Medera Moxma Diaz
 - Helena Bourre
 - Adelina Dinkova
 - Suzanna Miltanovica
 - Sureyya Eray
 - Jenni Rautawaara
 - Cynthia Lustig
 - Teresa Rousso
 - Kelly Smit
 - Olga Makaron
 - Marilyne Rambourt
 - UNKNOWN
 Mediterranean - Cathy Palombo
 - Monica Zamfir
 - Geraldine Flechmon
 New Caledonia (French Territory) - Tanya Lise Chitty
 - Carina Mjones
 - Beata Palega
 - Iolanda Bellu
 - Polina Gavia
 Scandinavia - Marika Toppari
 - Kelly Hodson
 - Cristina Moreno
 - Mimmi Gunnarsson
 - Katie Pastori
 - Bilge Kara
 Turkish Republic of Northern Cyprus - UNKNOWN
 - Natalia Egorava
 - Anna Marie Todino
 - Trudi Leeson

References

External links 
 

Miss Europe
1996 beauty pageants
1996 in Albania
1996 in Turkey